"One for My Baby (and One More for the Road)" is a hit song written by Harold Arlen and Johnny Mercer for the movie musical The Sky's the Limit (1943) and first performed in the film by Fred Astaire.

Background
Harold Arlen described the song as "another typical Arlen tapeworm" – a "tapeworm" being the trade slang for any song which went over the conventional 32-bar length. He called it "a wandering song. [Lyricist] Johnny [Mercer] took it and wrote it exactly the way it fell. Not only is it long – fifty-eight bars – but it also changes key. Johnny made it work." In the opinion of Arlen's biographer, Edward Jablonski, the song is "musically inevitable, rhythmically insistent, and in that mood of 'metropolitan melancholic beauty' that writer John O'Hara finds in all of Arlen's music."

It was further popularized by  Frank Sinatra. Sinatra recorded the song several times during his career: in 1947 with Columbia Records, in 1954 for the film soundtrack album Young at Heart, in 1958 for Frank Sinatra Sings for Only the Lonely, in 1962 for Sinatra & Sextet: Live in Paris, in 1966 for Sinatra at the Sands and finally, in 1993, for his Duets album. At a Johnny Carson-hosted Rat Pack concert at the Kiel Opera House in St. Louis in 1965, Sammy Davis Jr., backed by Quincy Jones conducting the Count Basie Orchestra, performed the song imitating the styles of successively Fred Astaire, Nat King Cole, Billy Eckstine, Vaughn Monroe, Tony Bennett, Mel Tormé, Frankie Laine, Louis Armstrong, an inebriated Dean Martin, and Jerry Lewis. Bennett, the last surviving of those imitated, continued to perform the song until his retirement in 2021 at the age of 95. During his final concert performances, at Radio City Music Hall, Bennett's performance of 'One For My Baby' was deemed a "highlight of his set" that "went from daring [due to the circumstances] to sublime".

Recordings
Countless renditions of "One for My Baby (and One More for the Road)" have been performed. The following is a list of notable/well-known versions which have been recorded thus far:

Fred Astaire (1943) – 4:59 – Available on Somewhere Over the Rainbow: The Golden Age of Hollywood Musicals and Hollywood's Best: The 40s
Johnny Mercer (1946) – 3.09 – Available on Capitol Collector's Series
Frank Sinatra (1947) – 3:07 – Available on The Essential Frank Sinatra: The Columbia Years
Cab Calloway (1951) – 3:20 – As a single, with Shot Gun Boogie; available on Hi-De-Ho and Other Movies (2004)
Frankie Laine (1951) – 3:39 – On "One For My Baby" and available on The Legend at His Best
Harold Arlen (1952) – 4:15 – Available on Too Marvelous For Words: Capitol Sings Johnny Mercer
Marlene Dietrich (1954) – 4:07 – Available on Love Songs
Frank Sinatra (1954) – 4:05 – Recorded for the soundtrack to the film Young at Heart; available on Frank Sinatra in Hollywood 1940–1964
Harry James (1955) - 3:38 – Available on Jazz Session (Columbia CL 669)
Tony Bennett (1957) – 3:10 – A chart single, recorded live; a later studio version appeared in 1992 on Perfectly Frank
Billie Holiday (1957) – 5:42 – Available on Songs for Distingué Lovers
Lena Horne (1957) – 3:24 – Available on Bluebird's Best: The Young Star
Della Reese (1957) – 4:02 – On Melancholy Baby; available on The Singles Collection 1955-1962
Harry Belafonte (1958) – 4:34 – Available on Belafonte Sings the Blues
Frank Sinatra (1958) – 4:23 – Available on Frank Sinatra Sings for Only the Lonely; a piano-only rehearsal version is available on The Capitol Years box set
Fred Astaire (1959) - 3:02 – Available originally on Now [Kapp 1165 / 3049]
Jula De Palma (1959) – 3:24 – On "Buone Vacanze", available on Jula in Jazz 2
Julie London (1959) – 4.10 – Available on Your Number Please
Perry Como (1960) – 3:45 – Available on the long play record So Smooth
Ella Fitzgerald (1960) – 4:18 – Available on Ella Fitzgerald Sings Songs from Let No Man Write My Epitaph
Ella Fitzgerald (1961) – 3:58 – Available on Ella Fitzgerald Sings the Harold Arlen Songbook
Etta James (1961) – 3:26 – Available on The Second Time Around
Wes Montgomery (1961) – 7:38 - Available on SO Much Guitar!
Chuck Berry (1965) – 2:44 – Available on Fresh Berry's
Marvin Gaye (1966) – 4:31 – Available on Moods of Marvin Gaye
Frank Sinatra (1966) – 4:40 – (live version) – Available on Sinatra at the Sands
Sammy Davis Jr. (1967) – 10:20 – On the live album That's All!
Bing Crosby (1968) - 3.30 - Available on Bing Crosby's Treasury - The Songs I Love (1968 version)
Lou Rawls (1968) – 4:25 – On You're Good To Me; Later available on Great Gentlemen of Song: Spotlight on Lou Rawls
Johnny Mercer (1974) – 3:58 – Available on My Huckleberry Friend
Willie Nelson (1979) – 2:36 – Available on Willie & Leon: One For the Road
Susannah McCorkle (1981) – 4:12 – On The Songs of Johnny Mercer
Iggy Pop (1981) – 4:05 – Available on Party
Rosemary Clooney (1983) – 3:46 – On Rosemary Clooney Sings the Music of Harold Arlen
Rob Wasserman and Lou Reed (1988) – 4:06 – On Duets
Lou Reed (1989) – 5:40 – On Live n London; available on New York in L.A.
Bette Midler (1992) – 4:06 – Available on Experience The Divine: Greatest Hits (1993)
Kenny G featuring Frank Sinatra (1997) - 6:08 – On Kenny G – Greatest Hits; paired with an instrument intro of Sinatra's "All the Way"
Iggy Pop (1997) – 6:04 (live version) – Available on Heroin Hates You
Linda Eder (1999) – 4:27 – On It's No Secret Anymore
Laura Fygi (1999) – 5:59 (live version) – On Laura Fygi's Tunes of Passion
Frank Stallone (1999) – 4:31 – Available on Soft And Low
Robbie Williams (2001) – 4:15 – Available on Swing When You're Winning
Danny Aiello (2004) -- On I Just Wanted to Hear the Words
Chris Botti (2004) – 4:53 –  On When I Fall in Love 
Joe Longthorne (2005) – 4:26 – On Perfect Love
Mina (2005) – Available on L'allieva
Nana Mouskouri (2005) – 3:15 – Available on I'll remember you 
Dianne Reeves (2005) – 3:50 – On Good Night, and Good Luck (Original Soundtrack)
Toots Thielemans with Jamie Cullum (2006) - - Available on One More for the Road 2006. Verve
Sylvia Brooks (2009) – Available on  Dangerous LiaisonsTony Bennett & John Mayer (2011) – 2:58 – on Duets IIHugh Laurie (2013) – Available on Didn't It RainLaura Dickinson (2014) – 4:29 – Available on One For My Baby - To Frank Sinatra With LoveTrisha Yearwood (2018) - Available on her Frank Sinatra tribute album Let's Be FrankWillie Nelson (2018) - Available on his Frank Sinatra tribute album My WayDonald Duck (Tony Anselmo) (2022) - Available on the compilation album The MousePack - Mickey and Friends Singing Classic StandardsLeo Caruso (2022) Available on his "Noir" album

In film and television

In addition to its original performance by Fred Astaire in The Sky's the Limit (1943), the song has been performed in other films and television shows.
 A piano version of the song can be heard in the background in the Rocky's scene toward the end of Youth Runs Wild (1944). Arlen and Mercer are not credited.
 Ida Lupino sings it as the new talent from Chicago at Jefty's Road House in Jean Negulesco's Road House (1948), prompting a character to remark: "She does more without a voice than anybody I've ever heard."
 Jane Russell sings it, wearing a metallic evening gown, in the Josef von Sternberg/Nicholas Ray film noir Macao (1952).
 The song plays prominently in the 1954 adventure-mystery film Dangerous Mission, in which it is played on a piano by a gangster who is killed.  The only people who know what song he was playing at the time of the murder are his assailant and a witness (Piper Laurie), whom the killer is after.
 "One for My Baby" is the theme song of the 1957–1958 NBC detective series Meet McGraw, starring Frank Lovejoy.
 The song is featured in the 1971 movie The Abominable Dr. Phibes being played by an animatronic piano player constructed by Dr. Phibes (Vincent Price); however, its inclusion in the movie is an anachronism, as the movie is set in the 1920s and the song was recorded in 1943.
 The song was by sung by Bette Midler to Johnny Carson on the penultimate night of The Tonight Show Starring Johnny Carson (May 21, 1992). Both Midler and Carson got caught up in the emotion of the song, and a heretofore unused camera angle on the set framed the two and the performance. It earned Midler that year's Emmy Award for Outstanding Individual Performance in a Variety or Music Program. The lyrics were adapted by Marc Shaiman to suit the occasion – such as "And, John, I know you're getting anxious to close".
 Dianne Reeves' rendition of the song is featured throughout the closing credits of George Clooney's Good Night, and Good Luck (2005), and is available on the film's official soundtrack album.
 Frank Sinatra's cover of the song appeared in Blade Runner 2049 (2017).
 In November 2017, Bono and Chris Martin performed the song on a Jimmy Kimmel Live! fundraiser special for World AIDS Day.
 In June 2018, the song was played in the background of the final scene of the Season 3 finale of Billions, during the conversation between Wendy and Axe.
 in December 2018, Frank Sinatra's cover of the song is used in a sequence in the Season 2 finale of The Marvelous Mrs. Maisel''.

References

1943 songs
Songs with music by Harold Arlen
Pop standards
Torch songs
Songs with lyrics by Johnny Mercer
Songs about alcohol
Songs about driving under the influence
Frank Sinatra songs
Etta James songs
Lena Horne songs
Bette Midler songs
Robbie Williams songs
Marvin Gaye songs
Fred Astaire songs